Alessio Murgia (born 1 June 1997) is an Italian football player. He plays for Aprilia.

Club career
He made his Serie C debut for Olbia on 27 August 2016 in a game against Renate.

References

External links
 

1997 births
Living people
Italian footballers
Footballers from Sardinia
Association football midfielders
People from the Province of South Sardinia
Cagliari Calcio players
Olbia Calcio 1905 players
S.S.D. Sanremese Calcio players
F.C. Aprilia Racing Club players
Serie C players
Serie D players